William Vivanco (born October 6, 1975 in Santiago) is a Cuban composer and musician. Vivanco learned to play guitar by visiting Casa de la Trova on Calle Heredia in Santiago. He busked in the streets, and also performed with a professional children's choir. He trained his voice, learning the techniques that would enable him to develop his distinctively percussive vocal style. He also played day-long romerias and at the Festival of Singers of the Americas in Guantánamo.

Vivanco first came to Havana when he was 23 years old. He made his first solo album, Lo Tengo To' Pensa'o, a mix of Brazilian music, pop and reggae, under the Bis Music label in 2002. His most well-known song is "Cimarrón" (means: "one who lives on mountaintops"). The song refers to African slaves who ran away from their Spanish masters. 
 
In 2006, Vivanco recorded his second solo album, La Isla Milagrosa, produced by Descemer Bueno and Roberto Carcassés. In recent times Vivanco has started to distance himself from his funkier, poppier tunes in favor of rhythmic traditional Cuban music from Santiago.

Vivanco has performed in France numerous times. 

In 2003 he performed at Les Transmusicales de Rennes festival, then in 2004 at the Paleo Festival de Nyon, at the Cuban night of Les Nuits de Fourvière de Lyon, and in August 2005 he played at the Vence festival Les Nuits du Sud.

Discography
 2002: Lo Tengo To' Pensa'o
 2006: La Isla Milagrosa
 2009: El Mundo Está Cambia'o
 2016: Mejorana
 2018: La isla milagrosa (Remasterizado)
 2020: Trece Con Magia

References

 Video interview of William Vivanco on Havana-Cultura

External links
 http://www.planete-aurora.com/en-vivanco/a.php
 https://www.nme.com/video/id/kYyewB0iMyc/search/vivanco
 http://www.dailymotion.com/video/x4by5d_william-vivanco-el-pilon_music
 https://web.archive.org/web/20100329045703/http://www.cubaabsolutely.com/music/contemporary.htm

Cuban composers
Male composers
Cuban male singer-songwriters
1975 births
Living people
Cuban male musicians